The 1938 United States Senate elections in Arizona took place on November 3, 1938. Incumbent Democratic U.S. Senator Carl Hayden ran for reelection to a third term, defeating Republican nominee Burt H. Clingan in the general election.

In contrast to previous elections, Hayden was easily reelected, receiving only token opposition from a relatively unknown Republican challenger.

Democratic primary

Candidates
 Carl T. Hayden, incumbent U.S. Senator
 Robert E. Miller
 Whit I. Hughes

Results

Republican primary

Candidates
 Burt H. Clingan, chairman of the Arizona Industrial Commission

General election

See also 
 United States Senate elections, 1938

References

1938
Arizona
United States Senate